Jaubari may refer to:

Jaubari, Gandaki, Nepal
Jaubari, Lumbini, Nepal